The rodent subfamily Rhizomyinae includes the Asian bamboo rats and certain of the African mole-rats. The subfamily is grouped with the Spalacinae and the Myospalacinae into a family of fossorial muroid rodents basal to the other Muroidea.

The group includes 17 species classified in 3 genera and 2 tribes:

Subfamily Rhizomyinae
Tribe Rhizomyini - Bamboo rats
Genus Rhizomys
Hoary bamboo rat, Rhizomys pruinosus
Chinese bamboo rat, Rhizomys sinensis
Large bamboo rat, Rhizomys sumatrensis
Genus Cannomys
Lesser bamboo rat, Cannomys badius
Tribe Tachyoryctini
Genus Tachyoryctes - African mole-rats
Ankole African mole-rat, Tachyoryctes ankoliae
Mianzini African mole-rat, Tachyoryctes annectens
Aberdare Mountains African mole-rat, Tachyoryctes audax
Demon African mole-rat, Tachyoryctes daemon
Kenyan African mole-rat, Tachyoryctes ibeanus
Big-headed African mole-rat, Tachyoryctes macrocephalus
Navivasha African mole-rat, Tachyoryctes naivashae
King African mole-rat, Tachyoryctes rex
Rwanda African mole-rat, Tachyoryctes ruandae
Rudd's African mole-rat, Tachyoryctes ruddi
Embi African mole-rat, Tachyoryctes spalacinus
Northeast African mole-rat, Tachyoryctes splendens
Storey's African mole-rat, Tachyoryctes storeyi

Note that the Rhizomyinae do not include two other groups which also have the common name mole rats and are also found in Africa. The closely related subfamily Spalacinae consists of mole-like rodents found in Africa and the Middle East; these are also Myomorphic rodents. The family Bathyergidae, or African mole-rats (including the well-known naked mole-rat), belong to the other major division of the rodents, the Hystricomorphs.

All the rhizomyines are bulky, slow-moving, burrowing animals, the Rhizomys species being the largest and stockiest. They vary in length from 150 to 480 mm (head and body) with a tail of 50 to 200 mm, and their weights are from 150 g to 4 kg, depending on the species. They mainly feed on the underground parts of plants, which they reach from foraging burrows. They are rarely active above ground, and if they do come out of their extensive burrow systems, it is at twilight or during the night. They are similar to the pocket gophers but lack cheek pouches. All are to some extent agricultural pests, attacking food crops, and are therefore hunted; the Asian species are eaten in the areas where they are found, while the skins of the African species are used as amulets.

References

Spalacidae
Mammal subfamilies